The 4 x 100 metres relay at the 1983 World Championships in Athletics was held in the Helsinki Olympic Stadium on August 10. Although this event was won by the East German team, it is generally accepted that those athletes were part of a programme of performance-enhancing drug usage (doping in East Germany). There are strong calls for the Great Britain team to be awarded the gold medal since they can be considered to have been the real winners, as is often the case involving those who lost out to East German drug cheats in the 1980s.


Medals

Records
Existing records at the start of the event.

Results

Heats
All times shown are in seconds.

Heat 1
 (Joan Baptiste, Kathy Cook, Beverley Callender, Shirley Thomas) 43.06 Q
 (Ginka Zagorcheva, Anelia Nuneva, Nadezhda Georgieva, Pepa Pavlova) 43.19 Q
 (Lyudmila Kondratyeva, Yelena Vinogradova, Irina Olkhovnikova, Olga Antonova) 43.51 Q
 (Jarmila Nygrýnová-Strejčková, Stepanka Sokolova, Radislava Soborova, Eva Murková) 43.89 Q
 (Monika Hirsch, Elke Vollmer, Michaela Schabinger, Ute Thimm) 44.21
 (Carla Mercurio, Erica Rossi, Daniela Ferrian, Marisa Masullo) 44.46
 (Sisko Markkanen-Hanhijoki, Helinä Marjamaa, Margareete Honkaharju, Riitta Ketonen) 44.77
 (Britt Hansen, Lisbet Nissen-Petersen, Helle Theil, Dorthe A. Rasmussen) 45.04

Heat 2
 (Silke Gladisch, Marita Koch, Ingrid Auerswald, Marlies Göhr) 42.59 Q
 (Leleith Hodges, Jacqueline Pusey, Juliet Cuthbert, Merlene Ottey) 43.10 Q
 (Marie-France Loval, Marie-Christine Cazier-Ballo, Rose-Aimée Bacoul, Liliane Gaschet) 43.52  Q
 (Angela Bailey, Marita Payne-Wiggins, Tanya Brothers, Molly Killingbeck) 44.19  Q
 (Alice Brown, Diane Williams, Chandra Cheeseborough, Randy Givens) 44.20
 (Shonel Ferguson, Pauline Davis, Whelma Colebrook, Oralee Fowler) 44.76
 (Grace Armah, Mercy Addy, Elisabeth Wilson, Mary Mensah) 47.51

Final
 (Silke Gladisch, Marita Koch, Ingrid Auerswald, Marlies Göhr) 41.76
 (Joan Baptiste, Kathy Cook, Beverley Callender, Shirley Thomas) 42.71
 (Leleith Hodges, Jacqueline Pusey, Juliet Cuthbert, Merlene Ottey) 42.73
 (Ginka Zagorcheva, Anelia Nuneva, Nadezhda Georgieva, Pepa Pavlova) 42.93
 (Angela Bailey, Marita Payne-Wiggins, Tanya Brothers, Molly Killingbeck) 43.05
 (Lyudmila Kondratyeva, Yelena Vinogradova, Irina Olkhovnikova, Olga Antonova) 43.22
 (Marie-France Loval, Marie-Christine Cazier-Ballo, Rose-Aimée Bacoul, Liliane Gaschet) 43.40
 (Jarmila Nygrýnová-Strejčková, Stepanka Sokolova, Radislava Soborova, Eva Murková) 43.78

References
IAAF results, heats
IAAF results, final

4 x 100 metres relay women
Relays at the World Athletics Championships
4 × 100 metres relay
1983 in women's athletics